Senator Hooker may refer to:

Cheryl Hooker (born 1950), Vermont State Senate
S. Percy Hooker (1860–1915), New York State Senate